Spirit FM is a network of Christian radio stations in central Missouri broadcasting Christian adult contemporary music.

Spirit FM debuted in 1985, when its first station KCVO-FM in Camdenton, near Osage Beach began broadcasting. Spirit FM is currently heard on 11 full powered stations and 4 low powered translators. Their combined footprint extends into portions of the Columbia/Jefferson City, Springfield, Kansas City and Ottumwa, Iowa, markets.

In 2023, the University of Northwestern – St. Paul, whose Northwestern Media division operates Christian radio stations in the Midwest, filed to acquire the Lake Area Educational Broadcasting Foundation.

Stations

Notes:

Low Powered Translators

References

External links
Spirit FM's official website
Spirit FM's webcast

Christian radio stations in the United States
American radio networks
Radio stations in Missouri